Keelan Johnson (born September 26, 1989) is a former Canadian football cornerback. He played college football at Arizona State University. He signed with the Miami Dolphins as an undrafted free agent in 2013. He has also played for the Philadelphia Eagles.

Professional career

Miami Dolphins
On April 27, 2013, he signed with the Miami Dolphins as an undrafted free agent.

Philadelphia Eagles
He was signed on the Philadelphia Eagles's practice squad on September 2, 2013 after being waived by the Dolphins. Johnson was added to the Eagles active roster on December 17, 2013. He was released by the Eagles on August 30, 2014.

Dallas Cowboys
On January 23, 2015, Johnson was signed by the Dallas Cowboys. On July 2, 2015, he was released by the Cowboys.

Seattle Seahawks
On August 17, 2015, Johnson was signed by the Seattle Seahawks. On August 31, 2015, he was released by the Seahawks.

Ottawa Redblacks
Johnson signed with the Ottawa Redblacks in 2016.

BC Lions
Johnson signed with the BC Lions on February 15, 2018.

References

External links
 BC Lions bio
 Miami Dolphins bio

1989 births
Living people
American football safeties
Canadian football defensive backs
American players of Canadian football
Arizona State Sun Devils football players
Philadelphia Eagles players
Miami Dolphins players
Dallas Cowboys players
Seattle Seahawks players
Ottawa Redblacks players
BC Lions players
Mesa High School alumni